United Company RUSAL, international public joint-stock company is the world's second largest aluminium company by primary production output (as of 2016). It was the largest until overtaken by China Hongqiao Group in 2015. UC RUSAL accounts for almost 9% of the world's primary aluminium output and 9% of the world's alumina production.

The United Company was formed by the merger of RUSAL (Russkiy alyuminiy, lit. Russian aluminium), SUAL, and the alumina assets of Glencore, completed in March 2007. According to its own statistics, UC Rusal accounts for 6.2% of the world's primary aluminium output and 6.5% of the world's alumina production, while operating assets in 13 countries over five continents, employing over 61,000 people across its international operations and offices.

The company is incorporated in Jersey, where it has its financial centre, but its headquarters are in Moscow, Russian Federation. UC Rusal is a public limited company and its shares are traded on the Moscow Stock Exchange, Hong Kong Stock Exchange and European Stock Exchange. Since 25 September 2020, the company changed its place of registration from Jersey to Kaliningrad, Russia. In 2021 RUSAL announced a proposal to demerge its high carbon assets and change its name to AL+.

Company history

Predecessor companies 1991 – 2000 

UC Rusal's roots lie in the business activities of Russian businessman Oleg Deripaska, who entered the metals industry as a commodities agent and broker at the Moscow Trade Stock Exchange (Moskovskaya Tovarnaya Birzha (MTB)) and then at the Russian Commodities and Raw Materials Exchange (Rossiyskaya Tovarno-Syryevaya Birzha (RTSB)). As a broker, Deripaska dealt in a wide range of commodities, including aluminium. His work also included trading with major Russian aluminium smelters.

Between 1991 and 1994, companies set up by Mr. Deripaska with the backing of industrialist and entrepreneur Michael Cherney, started investing in the shares of Sayanogorsk Aluminum Smelter (SAZ), one of the newest and most modern aluminium plants built in Soviet times (1980–1985). In 1994, Mr. Deripaska was elected the General Director of SAZ.

In 1997, the companies controlled by Deripaska underwent a general restructuring, leading to the creation of Sibirsky Aluminium to manage aluminium and alumina assets acquired by Deripaska's companies. By 2000, Sibirsky Aluminium managed, among other aluminium-related assets, majority interests in the Sayanogorsk aluminium smelter, the Sayanal foil mill, a fabricating plant in Samara, Russia, and a minority interest in the Nikolaev alumina refinery in Ukraine.

Founding of Rusal and company expansion 2000 – 2007 
Gradual strategic acquisitions and growth projects eventually led to the creation of one of the world's largest aluminium and alumina producers. Rusal has historically opted to fully integrate its assets under centralized operational and management control. The company has achieved increased production and efficiency in most of its acquired facilities through production "creep" (improvements achieved through targeted improvements to key processes), as well as by undertaking key modernization and expansion projects.

Rusal was founded in 2000 after Sibirsky Aluminium and Millhouse Capital, owned by Roman Abramovich, agreed to merge their aluminium and alumina assets.

In 2002, Rusal also set up the Engineering and Technology Center in Krasnoyarsk, which is now the foundation of the company's internal R&D projects.

In 2003, Millhouse Capital sold its 50% stake in Rusal to Basic Element, which held the remaining half of the shares and belongs to Deripaska. In the Ukraine, RUSAL increased its share in the Nikolaev alumina refinery to 98%.

In 2004, Rusal made the strategic decision to focus on its upstream business and began disposing of its downstream assets, including the sale of its fabricating division to Alcoa in January 2005. The divestiture process was largely completed in 2006 with the distribution of certain aluminium construction plants and other non-core assets to companies controlled by RUSAL's beneficial owner. In 2004, Rusal obtained a licence to develop bauxite mines in Guyana and the Bauxite Company of Guyana was subsequently founded.

From 2004 to 2006, RUSAL acquired several strategically important assets around the globe. In 2004, RUSAL acquired a 90% interest in the Boxitogorsk alumina refinery in Russia and increased its holding in the Nikolaev alumina refinery to 100%.

In 2005, RUSAL bought a 50% stake in the Komi alumina project from SUAL and became its partner in the project, which involved the construction of an integrated bauxite and alumina complex in Russia's Komi Republic.

Also in 2005, RUSAL completed the acquisition of a 20% equity interest in one of the world's largest alumina refineries in terms of production capacity, Queensland Alumina Limited, located in Queensland, Australia.

Furthermore, RUSAL purchased assets of a cathode plant in Lingshi County of Shanxi Province, China. In April 2008, the company acquired assets of another cathode plant in Taigu County of Shanxi Province, China, which have been integrated into the existing cathode plant in Lingshi.

In 2006, RUSAL acquired assets of the state-owned Aroaima Mining Company in Guyana, acquired the remaining equity interest in the Friguia bauxite and alumina complex in Guinea, completed an extensive retrofit of the Armenal foil mill and commissioned the Khakas aluminium smelter in Russia, one of the most advanced aluminium production facilities in the world. RUSAL also acquired a 56.16% equity interest in the Sardinian alumina refinery, Eurallumina.

In May 2006, RUSAL and RusHydro signed a co-operation agreement for the construction of the Boguchanskaya hydropower station (HPP) and the Boguchansky aluminium smelter. RUSAL increased ownership in the Bratsk, Krasnoyarsk, Sayanogorsk, and Novokuznetsk aluminium smelters, the Achinsk and Boksitogorsk alumina refineries and the Russian National Aluminium and Magnesium Institute (VAMI) to 100% in November 2006, and in Sayanal in June 2007.

In order to stay competitive, the VAMI and SibVAMI aluminium and magnesium research institutes became the backbone for engineering and technology centres involved in the development of new unique production technologies including RA-300 and RA-400 reduction cells for RUSAL. The new technologies allowed for large-scale greenfield and brownfield projects. In 2005, RUSAL created its own engineering and construction subsidiary, Rusal-Engineering Development Limited, responsible for modernization and construction projects.

In December 2006, RUSAL acquired through a privatisation process a 77.5% equity interest in the Aluminium Smelter Company of Nigeria (ALSCON). The Group acquired a further 7.5% equity interest in ALSCON from MAN Ferrostaal AG in January 2008.

UC Rusal 
In late March 2007, the merger between RUSAL, its domestic competitor SUAL, as well as the bauxite and alumina assets of Swiss commodities trading group Glencore, created UC RUSAL. The merger created the world's largest aluminium company at the time, with assets in 17 countries across five continents, including 16 aluminium smelters, 12 alumina refineries, eight bauxite mines, three powder metallurgy plants, three silicon smelters, three secondary aluminium plants, three aluminium foil mills, two cryolite plants, and one cathode plant. The merger was completed in March 2007, at which time the newly formed company was estimated to have pro-forma sales of $12 billion and production capacity of about four million tonnes of aluminium and 11 million tonnes of alumina.

Company consolidation and expansion projects 
In November 2007, RUSAL signed a cooperation agreement with Samruk-Energo, a subsidiary of Samruk-Kazyna, on the creation of a 50/50 joint venture to operate the Bogatyr Komir LLP, the largest coal mining company in Kazakhstan.

Because of a string of mergers and acquisitions, particularly that of Norilsk Nickel, UC Rusal had a high level of debt, which was exacerbated by the onset of the global financial crisis in 2008. In order to be able to retain its stake in Norilsk Nickel, and to avoid having to float the stake to foreign lenders, UC Rusal received a $4.5 billion loan from Russian state bank VEB to repay debts to foreign creditors. As part of its debt consolidation efforts in 2009, UC Rusal reduced the costs of its operations by 25%. In December 2009, a final agreement between the company and 72 Russian and international lenders to refinance $17 billion of debt were reached.

In January 2009, Oleg Deripaska was appointed Rusal's CEO, replacing Alexander Bulygin, who had held the post for 3 years.

In January 2010, UC RUSAL was listed on the Hong Kong Stock Exchange with its IPO price of HK$10.8 per share and capital raising of US$2.2 billion. The IPO attracted investors such as Nathaniel Rothschild, Robert Kuok, Paulson & Co, John Paulson and Vneshekonombank. Rusal also trades global depository receipts on the NYSE Euronext in Paris.

August 2011 saw Rusal reach an agreement with Sberbank to extend the maturity of debts until 2016, thereby cancelling VEB's loan used to repay debts to lenders.

In October 2011, UC Rusal announced that it had completed all debt refinancing of outstanding payments worth $11.4 billion. As a result, the company was freed from all investment and dividend payment restrictions, and announced new investments into the modernisation of old smelters and construction of new smelters in Siberia.

With Chinese aluminium demand growing due to rapid urbanization and industrialization, UC Rusal signed a joint venture agreement with China North Industries Corporation (NORINCO) in April 2012. Rusal also signed a memorandum of understanding with one of its main competitors, Shandong Xinfa Group, pertaining to the study of future potential cooperation areas, such as joint ventures.

March 2014 saw UC Rusal enter into a 50/50 share joint venture with Israeli automotive component manufacturer Omen High Pressure Die Casting to produce automotive components.

Resulting from massive overcapacity in the aluminium market due to China increasing its output of primary aluminium, global aluminium prices fell in the years 2007 to 2013, leading Rusal to report a loss of US$3.2bn in 2014. The company asked creditors to agree to delay payments on part of its US$10bn net debt pile. In August that year, national and international lenders agreed to allow the restructuring of its debt.

In November 2014, Vladislav Solovyov was appointed as Rusal's CEO, while Deripaska assumed the role of company president.

In 2016, UC Rusal signed another joint venture agreement with a Chinese firm, Hebei Joy Sense Cable Co. (HJSC), to produce aluminium cable for electrical applications.

In 2017, Rusal issued two Eurobonds to finance its debts. The first one, worth US$600 million, was issued in February, followed by a second one in April, worth US$500 million. Also in February, plans were announced to sell 10 billion yuan worth of seven-year onshore bonds to finance purchases in China, making Rusal the first foreign company to offer panda bonds on the Shanghai Stock Exchange. The company also agreed on a pre-export finance mechanism with international lenders worth US$1.7 billion for debt refinancing.

In April 2017, Rusal signed a joint venture with Indian firm Runaya Metsource for producing aluminum paste and powder, with commercial activities set to commence in 2018.

In April 2022, Rusal America Corporation was sold to former executives Brian Hesse and Andrey Donets and subsequently renamed PerenniAL.

Company structure and activities 
As of 2016, UC Rusal's biggest shareholders are En+ Group with a controlling stake of 48.13%, along with Onexim Group (13.7%) and SUAL (15,80%). 8.75% is owned by Amokenga Holdings, Toni Shterev owns 00.1% of the shares Rusal.a wholly owned subsidiary of Glencore. The remaining 13.37% account for the public float, and shareholding by the company management (0.25%).

It was announced on 11 August that Onexim agreed to sell 7% of its Rusal stake to SUAL. In February, Onexim had already sold 3.3% to SUAL. Once the sale is approved, Onexim will retain a 6.7% stake in Rusal, while SUAL's will increase to 22.80%.

Operations
As of the end of 2020, UC Rusal owned 9 aluminium smelters, 9 alumina refineries, 7 bauxite mines worldwide, and 4 domestic foil rolling mills.

Smelters

Russia
Rusal owns and operates eight aluminium smelters, four alumina refineries and three foil rolling mills in Russia:
 Bratsk Aluminium Smelter, Bratsk
 Irkutsk Aluminium Smelter, Shelekhov
 Krasnoyarsk Aluminium Smelter, Krasnoyarsk
 Kandalaksha Aluminium Smelter
 Novokuznetsk Aluminium Smelter, Novokuznetsk
 Nadvoitsy Aluminium Smelter
 Sayanogorsk Aluminium Smelter, Sayanogorsk
 Khakas Aluminium Smelter, Sayanogorsk
 Volgograd Aluminium Smelter
 Urals Aluminium Smelter
 Boguchany Aluminium Smelter 
 Bogoslovsk Aluminium Smelter

Sweden 
 KUBAL – Kubal is one of the largest industrial facilities in Central Sweden and the only primary aluminium producer in the country.

Nigeria 
 Aluminium Smelter Company of Nigeria (ALSCON) – Smelter in Akwa Ibom state of Nigeria

Refineries

Russia 
 Achinsk Aluminium Refinery
 Boksitgorsk 
 Bogoslovsk
 Urals

Guinea 
 Friguia Aluminium Refinery

Australia
 Queensland Alumina Limited – minority ownership

Italy 
 Eurallumina Alumina Refinery

Ireland 
 Rusal Aughinish, Europe's largest bauxite refinery.

Jamaica 
 Windalco

Ukraine 
 Nikolaev Alumina Refinery

Bauxite mines

Russia 
 Timan
 North Urals
 Sevuralboksitruda

Guinea 
 Compagnie des Bauxites de Kindia
 Friguia Bauxite and Alumina Complex
 Dian-Dian Project

Guyana
 Bauxite Company of Guyana

Foil mills 
 Sayanal
 Ural Foil
 Armenal
 Sayanskaya Folga

Joint ventures 
 UC Rusal – RusHydro, 2005
 UC Rusal – China North Industries Corporation (NORINCO), April 2012
 UC Rusal – Omen High Pressure Die Casting, March 2014
 UC Rusal – Hebei Joy Sense Cable Co. (HJSC), July 2016
 UC Rusal – Runaya Metsource, April 2017
 UC Rusal – SKAD, April 2017
 UC Rusal - Braidy Industries Inc., April 2019

2018 U.S. sanctions
In April 2018, the United States imposed sanctions against Oleg Deripaska and his business enterprises, including Rusal, along with 23 other Russian nationals and entities in their control. According to The Washington Post, the Trump administration imposed those sanctions because of "Russia's 'malign activity.'" The United States Department of the Treasury issued a statement declaring that Deripaska was accused of illegal wiretapping, threatening the lives of business rivals, extortion and racketeering. Other allegations included that Deripaska ordered the murder of a businessman, and had links to a Russian organized crime group. On 23 April, however, the US government gave subsidiary Rusal America Corporation's customers "more time to comply with sanctions", even saying it would "consider lifting them if United Company Rusal Plc’s major shareholder, Russian tycoon Oleg Deripaska, ceded control of the company." Department of the Treasury gave these clients until 23 October 2018 to comply with (wind down business) the Rusal sanctions.

In May 2018, the company announced the resignation of CEO Alexandra Bouriko and seven board members in order to avoid U.S. sanctions against Oleg Deripaska.

In January 2019, the U.S. lifted sanctions after Deripaska reduced his stake in the company to less than 50% and his voting rights to less than 35%. US Senate majority leader Mitch McConnell among others argued that this would maintain pressure on Deripaska without disrupting aluminum markets. In April 2019 the company announced a project in Greenup, Kentucky that would produce flat-rolled aluminum products for the US automotive industry.

Sustainability 
In 2017, UC Rusal publicly stated its goal to cover all the energy required to power its aluminium smelters via clean energy by 2020, particularly using hydropower. In 2017, the company's energy mix included 90% renewables. The announcement was in line with UC Rusal's 2015 pledge to support the sustainable production of aluminium upon joining the Aluminium Stewardship Initiative.

As a response to increased demand for sustainably produced aluminium from major downstream industries – particularly the motor, packaging and electronics sectors – Rusal introduced Allow, a low-carbon aluminium brand, in November 2017. According to Reuters, Allow covers roughly 80% of Rusal's total output.

In 2017, Deripaska expressed support for introducing steep carbon taxation in order to force other firms away from using coal power and reduce the industry's carbon footprint.

Rusal signed an agreement in September 2021 with the UK’s Budweiser Brewing Group to produce five million ultra-low carbon beer cans. The cans will be 440ml in size and come from Rusal’s Krasnoyarsk plant in Siberia, which uses hydro-power as energy source.

Corporate social responsibility

2011 Japan earthquake 
Following the 2011 Toho earthquake and tsunami, UC Rusal donated $600,000 to Japanese children's and cultural heritage foundations. These included the Ashinaga Foundation providing financial and educational support to children; the Yul Foundation supporting the learning process and psychological rehabilitation of pupils; and donations to the Ishinomori Mangattan Museum in Miyagi Prefecture for the city's reconstruction of cultural attractions.

2012 Cholera outbreak in Sierra Leone 
In 2012, Rusal donated 25 tonnes of medical supplies to Sierra Leone to control the outbreak of cholera in the country as part of its commitment to corporate social responsibility.

2013 Nigeria fresh water projects 
In 2013, Rusal, in cooperation with Alscon, commissioned the construction of 14 fresh water facilities in Nigeria so as to provide potable water to more than 10,000 people in the Ikot Abasi region.

2014 Ebola outbreak 
During the 2014 Ebola outbreak in West Africa, UC Rusal provided logistical support to the international relief efforts. In 2015, the company invested $10 million to build the "Centre for epidemic and microbiological research and treatment" in Guinea to fight the spread of the virus. It also donated medication, as well as sanitary equipment to the Guinean Health Ministry, and was involved in setting up a mobile hospital containing 200 beds. Field trials for a Russian Ebola vaccine were carried out at the centre, and the vaccine was officially launched in August 2017 in Kindia, where the centre is located.

Carbon footprint
Rusal reported Total CO2e emissions (Direct + Indirect) for the twelve months ending 31 December 2020 at 28,604 Kt (+490/+1.7% y-o-y). The growth has slowed compared to the trend since 4Q'18 (CAGR +3.4%).

See also

 Aluminium: The Thirteenth Element
 Aluminium in Africa
 List of alumina refineries

References

External links
 
 Oleg Deripaska website
 
 MBendi:Mining:Bauxite:Asia:Russia

 
Aluminium companies of Russia
Companies based in Moscow
Manufacturing companies established in 2007
Russian companies established in 2007
Russian brands
Economy of Jersey
Companies listed on the Hong Kong Stock Exchange
Companies listed on the Moscow Exchange
Basic Element (company)
2010 initial public offerings